The 2009 Cincinnati mayoral election took place on November 3, 2009, to elect the Mayor of Cincinnati, Ohio. Usually a nonpartisan primary is held where the top two candidates move on to the general election, however, incumbent mayor Mark Mallory and Brad Wenstrup were the only two candidates to file, so no primary election was held.

While the election was nonpartisan, Mallory was a known Democrat and Wenstrup was a known Republican.

General election

References

Mayoral elections in Cincinnati
2009 Ohio elections
Cincinnati